Fidelity Records was an independent record label based in Hillsdale, New Jersey, United States, owned by Jonathan Strauss.

Bands 
The Escape Engine
We're All Broken
Race The Sun
Madison

History 
Jonathan Strauss launched Fidelity Records out of his New Jersey home in 2003. The label was formed to sign The Escape Engine, whose lead singer was a friend of Strauss's since grade school.

The Escape Engine's debut album success included a video that regularly appeared on the MTV2 music channel, numerous articles and press interviews in national music magazines such as Alternative Press Magazine and CMJ New Music Monthly, performing on 2003's Vans Warped Tour and CMJ Music Marathon, soundtrack credits on Warren Miller's Journey, and songs that appear on several nationally distributed music compilations.

Kevin B. Robbins teamed up with Jonathan in late 2003 and by 2004, the two had added We're All Broken and Race The Sun to the label's roster.

Because of Fidelity Records' success with The Escape Engine, the label came to be known as one of the most perplexing music industry occurrences of 2003; a small label, started by a 20-something from New Jersey with almost no prior record industry experience, who signed a band for their first release and seemingly from out of nowhere the band is a buzz and appearing on MTV.

Although the success was a gift by putting Fidelity on the map, it was just as much a curse as people waited for Fidelity prove itself once again.

Unfortunately, none of the other bands were able to surpass the success that Fidelity experienced with The Escape Engine.   Some claim it was because of finances that were wrapped up in the label's first release, or that the label lost its steam, or because it was simply beginners luck.  Whatever the case, by 2005, after the release of four albums and the break-up of several of the bands, the label appeared to have slow down almost to a halt.

In 2006 Jonathan Strauss along with Michel Bezoza & Dave Miller started Heroine Clothing.

Current
No additional bands have since been signed and no new releases are scheduled.

See also
 List of record labels

External links
Fidelity Records

References

American record labels
Alternative rock record labels
Indie rock record labels